FK Budućnost Banatski Dvor is a defunct football club based in Banatski Dvor, Vojvodina, Serbia. They competed in the First League of Serbia and Montenegro for two seasons in 2003–04 and 2005–06. The club also reached the final of the 2003–04 Serbia and Montenegro Cup, securing a spot in the 2004–05 UEFA Cup.

History
After being acquired by Yugoslav-Swiss businessman Mirko Vučurević, the club placed first in each season between 1995–96 and 1998–99, earning four consecutive promotions to reach the Serbian League Vojvodina. They subsequently finished runners-up in the third tier and were promoted to the Second League of FR Yugoslavia.

At the beginning of the new millennium, the club reached the quarter-finals of the FR Yugoslavia Cup in the 2000–01 season and the semi-finals two years later, losing to Red Star Belgrade on both occasions. In the 2002–03 season, they also won the Second League (Group North) and took promotion to the First League of Serbia and Montenegro for the first time in history. However, the club was promptly relegated from the top flight, but managed to reach the final of the 2003–04 Serbia and Montenegro Cup, losing 1–0 to Red Star Belgrade. As a result, they earned a spot in the 2004–05 UEFA Cup, but were eliminated by Slovenian side Maribor on the away goals rule in the second qualifying round. The same season, the club earned promotion back to the top flight.

In January 2006, following the cessation of Proleter Zrenjanin, it was reported that Budućnost Banatski Dvor became Banat Zrenjanin. However, the club's transformation was finalized after the 2005–06 season.

Honours
Second League of Serbia and Montenegro (Tier 2)
 2002–03 (Group North), 2004–05 (Group Serbia)

Seasons

European record

Notable players
This is a list of players who have played at full international level.
  Nikola Drinčić
  Nikola Beljić
  Zoran Tošić
  Nenad Kovačević
For a list of all FK Budućnost Banatski Dvor players with a Wikipedia article, see :Category:FK Budućnost Banatski Dvor players.

Managerial history

References

External links
 Club page at Srbijasport

1929 establishments in Serbia
2006 disestablishments in Serbia
Association football clubs disestablished in 2006
Association football clubs established in 1929
Defunct football clubs in Serbia
Football clubs in Vojvodina